Donal Ormonde (born 21 January 1943) is an Irish former Fianna Fáil politician and radiologist. He first stood for election to Dáil Éireann at the February 1982 general election, in the Waterford constituency, but was unsuccessful. He won a seat there at the November 1982 general election, but lost it at the 1987 general election. He was nominated by the Taoiseach in 1989 to the 19th Seanad. His father John Ormonde was a TD for Waterford from 1947 to 1965.

See also
Families in the Oireachtas

References

1943 births
Living people
Fianna Fáil TDs
Members of the 19th Seanad
Members of the 24th Dáil
Politicians from County Waterford
Nominated members of Seanad Éireann
Fianna Fáil senators